Herina germinationis is a species of picture-winged fly in the genus Herina of the family Ulidiidae In the United Kingdom it is a species of dry calcareous grassland including coastal cliffs.
United Kingdom and Switzerland.

References

Ulidiidae
Insects described in 1790
Diptera of Europe
Taxa named by Pietro Rossi